Richard B. Buffington (born April 16, 1945) is an American former football player and coach. After briefly playing college football at BYU, he played for 17–19 different minor league teams in several leagues. He became a coach afterwards, beginning in 1968 with Bristol Community College. Buffington was a scout and assistant coach in the National Football League (NFL) in the late 1970s, and was an administrator and coach in the United States Football League (USFL) from 1982 to 1984. From 1988 to 2000, Buffington was a coach for several teams in the Arena Football League (AFL), including serving as head coach for the Albany Firebirds (1990–1993), Connecticut Coyotes (1995), Charlotte Rage (1996), and Florida Bobcats (1998, 2000). He also coached the New Haven Ninjas (2002) and Albany Conquest (2004) in AF2, the New England Surge (2007) in the Continental Indoor Football League (CIFL), and the Boston Blaze (2017) in the Can-Am Indoor Football League.

Early life and playing career
Buffington was born on April 16, 1945, in Fall River, Massachusetts. At five years old, he was run over by a car, resulting in two broken legs. When they healed, Buffington "found that his legs were very strong, and that catapulted him to run continuously, and run every day and everywhere." At 15 years old, he enrolled at Durfee High School, where he played football. After graduating from there, Buffington played one season of freshman football at BYU in 1963. He was drafted to serve in the United States Navy shortly afterwards.

Buffington later returned to BYU, and after graduating from there, began a career in minor league football. He played for a total of at least 17 teams, with some sources listing as many as 19, including three at once. "[The three teams] were all in different leagues, and all three of them didn't have insurance," he later said. "I didn't care ... I just wanted to play, wanted to play, wanted to play and wanted to play." Leagues Buffington played in include the Atlantic Coast Football League (ACFL) (the NFL's minor league at the time), Eastern Football League (EFL), Boston Park League (BPL), and New England Football League (NEFL). In the ACFL, he played for the Rhode Island Steelers (1966), Bridgeport Jets (?), and Quincy Giants (1969). Buffington mainly played defensive back and kick returner. He was inducted into the Minor Pro Football Hall of Fame as a player in 1987.

Coaching career
Buffington began his coaching career in 1968, as head coach of the Bristol Community College football team in Fall River, Massachusetts. He founded the North-Tri Attleboro Kings of the Eastern Football League in 1973 and served as their head coach, general manager, and owner through 1976. He was hired as a part-time scout with the New York Jets in the National Football League in 1976 by Mike Holovak, and became Holovak's assistant when the latter was named interim head coach the following season.

He was promoted to the coaching staff later in the season, and was named coaches' administrative aide/administrative assistant the following year.

Buffington was hired by the New Jersey Generals of the new United States Football League (USFL) at the end of 1982, to serve as special teams and linebackers coach as well as a scout during the  season. He was so optimistic about the league that he declined an offer to become a defensive coach of the New York Giants. After the 1983 season ended, Buffington accepted a position as director of college and pro scouting with the Pittsburgh Maulers, but resigned in January  before the regular season began. A spokesperson said he resigned to "pursue other opportunities in professional football." In 1986, Buffington attempted to bring a professional football team to Boston through the America's Football Team Inc.

In his first season with the team, the Firebirds compiled a 3–5 record but missed the playoffs. Buffington was re-signed through the  season in August 1991. He brought them to the playoffs again in 1992 with a record of 5–5, but the Firebirds lost 45–48 in round one of the playoffs to the Dallas Texans. He was re-signed for the  season in October 1992.

In the 1993 season, the Firebirds compiled a 5–7 record, but still managed to secure a playoff spot, where they lost 45–48 to the eventual champion Tampa Bay Storm. He was fired following the year, and was replaced by Mike Hohensee. Buffington finished his time at Albany with a 19–21 regular season record, and a 19–24 overall record, having lost all three playoff games in which he coached.

In one season with the team, Buffington helped Las Vegas record the lowest allowed yards per game average (220.5), lowest passing yards per game average (195.9), and third lowest points allowed (487). Las Vegas made it to the playoffs, where they lost to Buffington's former team, the Albany Firebirds.

Buffington was among the candidates for the Tampa Bay Storm coaching job for the  season. Instead, he received the head coach and general manager job with the Connecticut Coyotes. The 1995 Connecticut Coyotes compiled a record of 1–11 with Buffington as coach, finishing tied for the worst record in the league.

In , Buffington was named head coach of the Charlotte Rage. He faced off against his former team, the Connecticut Coyotes, twice, and won each time (the first time by a score of 49–31, the second, 51–31). However, the Rage only won five games in the season, finishing 5–9 and out of the playoffs. He did not return to the team for a second season.

He was named head coach for the  season, and compiled a record of 3–11. The following season, he served as an assistant coach with the Milwaukee Mustangs. It was his final game coaching in the Arena Football League, as he finished with an overall record of 28–53 (28–56 including playoffs).

In , after spending a year out of coaching, Buffington was hired as head coach of the AF2 New Haven Ninjas, leading them to a 6–10 record. Two years later, he served as the coach of the Albany Conquest, helping them compile a 6–10 record. In 2007, he was hired as head coach of the New England Surge of the Continental Indoor Football League (CIFL) on a three-year contract, but was fired mid-season after the team lost three of their first four games. He returned to coaching for a final time in 2017 with the Boston Blaze of the Can-Am Indoor Football League, after which he retired.

Personal life
Buffington worked with comedian Jimmy Durante in 1964. In 2007, he joined the New England Patriots Alumni Club. Since retiring from coaching, he has participated at speaking events, youth clinics, and charitable functions. An arena football-based video game was developed using his material by EA Sports.

References

Notes

Citations

1945 births
Living people
American football defensive backs
American football return specialists
Players of American football from Massachusetts
Atlantic Coast Football League players
BYU Cougars football players
New York Jets coaches
New England Patriots coaches
United States Football League coaches
Denver Dynamite (arena football) coaches
Indiana Firebirds coaches
Anaheim Piranhas coaches
Connecticut Coyotes coaches
Charlotte Rage coaches
Florida Bobcats coaches
Milwaukee Mustangs (1994–2001) coaches
Coaches of American football from Massachusetts